Zhang Daixin is a general in the People's Liberation Army of China. Zhang holds the rank of major general in the PLA. He was investigated by the PLA's anti-graft agency in December 2014. Zhang served as Deputy Commander of Heilongjiang Military District from 2012 to 2014, previously he was the director of the Logistics Department of the 16th Army.

References

Living people
People's Liberation Army generals
21st-century Chinese military personnel
Year of birth missing (living people)